Hot Seat is a 2022 American action-thriller film directed and produced by James Cullen Bressack. It stars Kevin Dillon and Mel Gibson.

Premise
An anonymous criminal plants a bomb under the chair of an ex-hacker, and forces him to break into high-level banking institutions.

Cast

Production

Hot Seat is an action-thriller written by Collin Watts and Leon Langford. It is part of a long-term partnership between Grindstone Entertainment (a subsidiary of Lionsgate Films) and Emmett/Furla Oasis. The film was announced on October 15, 2021, as the third collaboration between actor Mel Gibson and producers Randall Emmett and George Furla. Filming took place in Las Cruces, New Mexico.

Release 
The film was released in select theaters, digital, and on demand on July 1, 2022.

Reception

Critical response

Box office
Hot Seat, in its limited theatrical release, grossed $68,798 at the box office.

References

External links
 

2020s English-language films
2022 action thriller films
American action thriller films
Films directed by James Cullen Bressack
2020s American films